Herina scutellaris is a species of picture-winged fly in the genus Herina of the family Ulidiidae found in most of Western Europe.

References

Ulidiidae
Insects described in 1830
Diptera of Europe